Battalion of Special Police Operations is a special operations force of the Military Police of the State of Acre (PMAC), directly subordinated to the General Command.The BOPE of the Military Police of Acre, is the Specialized Unit of the State to intervene in critical events involving hostage rescue, rural operations, shock operations and other specific missions. In addition to being the creator, diffuser and maintainer of all operational doctrine of the local military police, it is the troop created and maintained to provide operational support to the other PMAC Units, being, therefore, the last one in the escalation of force to the convenience of employment by the High Command Rank of the Corporation.

History
Decree 155 of March 28, 1990, published in the D.O.E. 5,260 / 90, provides for the creation and structuring of the 1st Military Police Battalion, “Battalion José Plácido de Castro”; this structure included the Special Operations companies -. Created since then, the COE, only in 1996, starts to function, being provisionally installed in the Headquarters of the General Command, as an Independent companies.

In 1998, it was subordinated to the 1st Military Police Battalion, settling on its premises. In 1999, the COE was transferred to its own facilities. With the publication of Law No. 2001 of March 31, 2008, which reorganizes the Basic Structure of the Military Police, regulated by Ordinance No. 425 / DRHM, dated August 5, 2010, COE becomes a Special Operations Battalion - BOPE , Unit directly subordinated to the Operational Policing Command - CPO I.

Since its creation, BOPE, according to the PMAC Restructuring Ordinance, will be employed in special and extraordinary missions of ostensive police and for the preservation of public order within the limits of the state territory.

The organizational structure of BOPE comprises the following Subunits: 
 Special Operations companies - COE, 
 Riot Control companies 
 Dog Policing companies.

Ranks and insignia

See also 
 Acre State
 Military Police of Brazil
 Military Firefighters Corps (Brazil)
 Brazilian Federal Police
 Federal Highway Police
 Brazilian Civil Police
 Brazilian Armed Forces
 Military Police
 Gendarmerie
 Military Police of Rio de Janeiro State
 Pacifying Police Unit
 GATE and ROTA (São Paulo Military Police)
 National Force of Public Safety (Brazilian federal special response unit)
 List of police tactical units

References

External links

 BOPE Rio de Janeiro, official website, in Portuguese
 BOPE Federal District of Brasilia official website, in Portuguese
  BOPE-POI informativo sobre Unidades Operacionais Especiais das Policias Internacionais.*POLICE – POLIZIA – POLITIE -ПОЛИЦИИ – POLIZEI*

Counterterrorist organizations
Specialist police agencies of Brazil
Acre